Nigel Dineen is a former Gaelic football manager and player who has served as a member of Roscommon County Council since June 2014. He played for the Castlerea St Kevin's club and at senior level for the Roscommon county team.

Playing career
Dineen won three Roscommon Senior Football Championship titles while playing for Castlerea St Kevin's: in 2003, 2008 and 2009. Castlerea lost to Sligo in 2010.

Post-playing career
In 2011, Dineen was appointed as manager of the Roscommon under-21 team for the 2012 season, having been a selector under the former management team. He led Roscommon to the Connacht Under-21 Football Championship title in his first year in the job and later to the All-Ireland Under-21 Football Championship final, where his side lost to Dublin.

Dineen challenged Kevin McStay for the Roscommon senior management role ahead of the 2017 season, but pulled out a month later, stating that he had "strong reservations about the integrity of the selection and recruitment process".

In June 2014, Dineen was elected to Roscommon County Council as an Independent.

References

Year of birth missing (living people)
Living people
Castlerea St Kevin's Gaelic footballers
Connacht inter-provincial Gaelic footballers
Gaelic football forwards
Gaelic football managers
Gaelic football selectors
Irish sportsperson-politicians
Roscommon inter-county Gaelic footballers